The Olympic National Park Headquarters Historic District overlooks Port Angeles, Washington from Peabody Heights, consisting of 6 contributing buildings built in 1940–44, 8 contributing structures and 17 non-contributing properties that act as the administrative headquarters for Olympic National Park. The contributing structures were built using locally obtained native materials in a late interpretation of the National Park Service Rustic style. Native landscaping enhances the site. Much of the work was carried out by Public Works Administration and Civilian Conservation Corps workers.

The most significant building is the Administration Building, a two-story masonry and wood-frame structure with a long, horizontal design, emphasized by linear banding in the shingle cladding of the second story. The Custodian's Residence or Superintendent's Residence housed the park superintendent until the 1980s when it was converted to offices. The irregularly shaped two-story building is similar in style and materials to the headquarters.

A somewhat separated area comprises several maintenance buildings. The Gas and Oil House building uses coursed stone and heavy timber, with a porte-cochere extending from the front to shelter gas pumps. The Transformer Vault and Pump House is similar in character. The Equipment Shed/Carpenter Shop is a stone and frame building in a saltbox shape with projecting bracketed eaves that anticipate the Mission 66 style structures on the 1950s and 1960s. This section was replaced with a historically faithful copy in 1970.

The Headquarters District is close to the park, but outside its primary boundaries. It was the first park headquarters to be situated outside its park. The district was placed on the National Register of Historic Places in 2007.

References

Park buildings and structures on the National Register of Historic Places in Washington (state)
Government buildings completed in 1941
Buildings and structures in Clallam County, Washington
National Register of Historic Places in Olympic National Park
National Park Service rustic in Washington (state)
Civilian Conservation Corps in Washington (state)
Historic districts on the National Register of Historic Places in Washington (state)
National Register of Historic Places in Clallam County, Washington